William "Willie" Auchterlonie (7 August 1872 – 27 February 1963) was a Scottish professional golfer. He was a native of St Andrews. His brother, Laurie Auchterlonie, won the 1902 U.S. Open.

Auchterlonie was honorary professional to The Royal and Ancient Golf Club of St Andrews for nearly a quarter of a century. He had begun his working life as an apprentice to the club makers R. Forgan & Son and he ran club making businesses for most of his adult life. There is still a golf shop called Auchterlonie's in St Andrews. He was involved in golf course design.

Major championships

Wins (1)

Results timeline

Note: Auchterlonie only played in The Open Championship.

CUT = missed the half-way cut
"T" indicates a tie for a place

References

Scottish male golfers
Winners of men's major golf championships
Golfers from St Andrews
1872 births
1963 deaths